"Return to normalcy" was a campaign slogan used by Warren G. Harding during the 1920 United States presidential election. Harding would go on to win the election with 60.4% of the popular vote.

1920 election
In a speech delivered on May 14, 1920, Harding proclaimed that America needed "not nostrums, but normalcy". Two months later, during a homecoming speech, Harding reaffirmed his endorsement of "normal times and a return to normalcy." World War I and the Spanish flu had upended life, and Harding said that it altered the perspective of humanity. He argued that the solution was to seek normalcy by restoring life to how it was before the war. Harding's conception of normalcy for the 1920s included deregulation, civic engagement, and isolationism. He rejected the idealism of Woodrow Wilson and the activism of Roosevelt, favoring the earlier isolationist policy of the United States.

Although detractors of the time tried to belittle the word "normalcy" as a neologism as well as a malapropism, saying that it was poorly coined by Harding (as opposed to the more accepted term normality), there was contemporaneous discussion and evidence that normalcy had been listed in dictionaries as far back as 1857. During the campaign Harding, a newspaper editor, addressed the issue of the word's origin, claiming that normalcy but not normality appeared in his dictionary.

Harding's position attracted support during the 1920 presidential election, which he won with 60.3% of the popular vote.

Other usage 
Chalmers M. Roberts of The Washington Post compared the desire for a "return to normalcy" in 1920 to the 1946 midterms following World War II and the 1992 presidential election following the Cold War.

The 12th episode of Boardwalk Empire takes place during the 1920 election and is titled "A Return to Normalcy".

The phrase "return to normalcy" became associated with the 2020 presidential campaign of Joe Biden, specifically referring to Biden's promises to end the "divisiveness of the Trump years," as well as his campaign's focus on tackling the COVID-19 pandemic in the United States.

See also 
 New normal, also concerned with trying to emerge from abnormal periods
 Presidency of Warren G. Harding
 Make America Great Again

References

External links

"Normalcy", The New Dictionary of Cultural Literacy, 3rd ed., edited by E. D. Hirsch, Jr., et al. Boston: Houghton Mifflin, 2002. .
"A Time for Normalcy" by Evan Jenkins, Columbia Journalism Review, January/February 2002.

American political catchphrases
United States presidential domestic programs
Warren G. Harding